= Chewing Sparkle =

Indonesian musical band

Chewing Sparkle are Indonesian indie rock quartet that formed on 2012 in Jakarta, Indonesia. The band currently consists of Ryanda Rahardjo (vocals and guitar), Nabyl Rahardjo (bass guitar and vocals), Dheny Tiyan (guitars), & Tomo (drums and vocals). The band feels like a voluptuous energy burst. Yet, in their tightly-packed music, Chewing Sparkle sets their twist and turns neatly. The band takes their time carefully, creating clever dynamics within each tracks, both in the way they operate as a band and in their music. Chewing Sparkle runs in a marathon, rather than a quick sprint.

Chewing Sparkle released their first single, Far East (2014) as their first introducing track and it led them to be Favorite Newcomer of Indonesia Cutting Edge Music Awards 2014. Later on the band released their first EP, Hugger Mugger, in 2016 under Demajors. The band also released music videos for the single Far East (2014) and Summerstorm (2016), a track from their first EP.

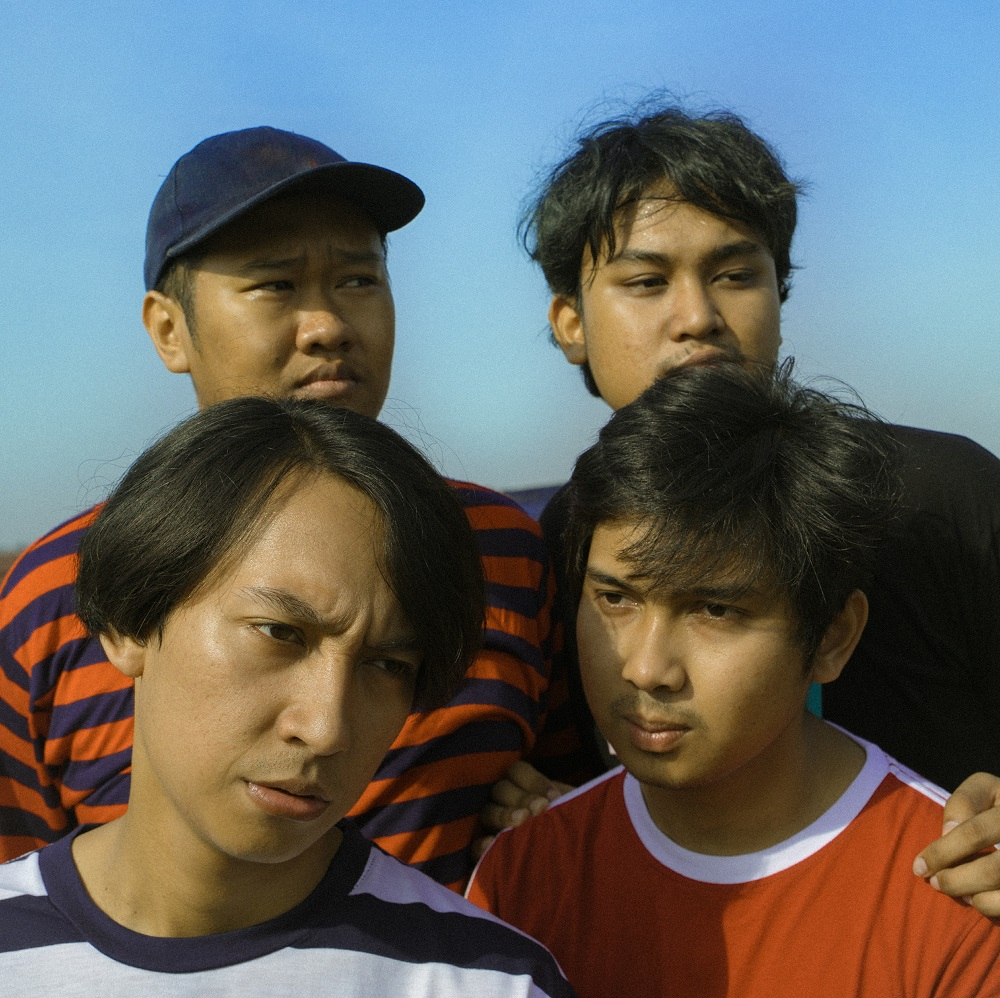
Chewing Sparkle - 2019
